Demonic Toys is a series of films that center on a collection of seemingly harmless playthings that are in reality the avatars of powerful demons from hell who seek to cause havoc in the mortal world.

Produced through Full Moon Features, the first film in the series, Demonic Toys, was released direct-to-video in 1992. It was followed by three additional films, all of which have crossovers with other Full Moon properties. The series has also led to a comic book series that was released through Full Moon Pictures and Eternity Comics, and a television spin-off series based on Baby Oopsie, which started airing on August 27, 2021. Season 2, titled Murder Dolls is set to premiere on July 15, 2022. as well as other merchandise.

Development 
Full Moon Features, then Full Moon Entertainment, released the first film in the series, Demonic Toys, direct-to-video in 1992. Directed by Peter Manoogian, the script was written by David S. Goyer and featured a score by the composer, Richard Band. His brother, Charles Band served as one of the film's producers.

The following year, Full Moon Features released a follow-up, Dollman vs. Demonic Toys, which crosses over with the films Bad Channels and Dollman. Footage from the first Demonic Toys, as well as from Dollman and Bad Channels, were used in the creation of the movie.

In 2004, Full Moon Features released a third film, Puppet Master vs. Demonic Toys,  which is a crossover with the Puppet Master series. The film was created as a made-for-TV movie for the SyFy Channel as a Christmas horror special. Filming took place in Bugaria and had a limited budget.

In 2010, a direct sequel to the first film was released titled Demonic Toys: Personal Demons. Screenwriter and director William Butler has stated that the first rendition of the movie's script used Los Angeles, California as a setting. This was re-written to utilize Charles Band's castle in Italy and also include a character from Band's 1997 film Hideous!, Dr. Lorca. Most of the filming was completed in Italy and the remainder was shot in the United States, using a cavern set used in the television series, Weeds.

A television series, titled Baby Oopsie, premiered in August 2021 on the Full Moon Features App and on Amazon Prime Video, as a spin-off and semi-sequel of Demonic Toys 2. Though it was at first thought to be the fifth film in the series, the conflict was resolved when Full Moon uploaded a trailer for Season 2 on April 25, 2022.

Films

Television series 
Full Moon began airing a television series titled Baby Oopsie, based on the title character from the original films, The series follows a woman named Sybil, who is forced to cover up her tracks after unknowingly adopting a murderous and loudmouthed baby doll. The series premiered on August 27, 2021 on Full Moon's Streaming App and their Amazon Prime Video channel. Season 2 premiered in Summer 2022. Season 3, the third and final season premiered on November 4, 2022 just a few months after the end of the second season.

Season 1 (2021)

Season 2: Murder Dolls (2022)

Season 3: Burn Baby Burn (2022)

Characters

Toys 
Baby Oopsie Daisy - The foul-mouthed, perverted doll in a similar manner to a Cabbage Patch Kid or other "baby" doll and leader of the toys.
Jack Attack - The evil jack-in-the-box with a grotesque killer-clown face attached to it.
Grizzly Teddy - The monstrous teddy bear.
Mr. Static - The demonic toy robot with real shooting lasers and fire like a flamethrower.
Zombietoid, or Zomb.i.e Joe - The blond-haired GI Joe action figure that makes a loud scream and kills people with his machete.
Divoletto - The smiling, cloaked ancient toy doll that makes a robotic ticking noise whenever he moves. He also makes a giggling sound now and then.
Toy Soldier - The spirit of Judith Gray's deceased child who possesses the toy soldier and protects her from the demonic toys.

Humans 
Judith Gray - A female officer, and the protagonist of Demonic Toys and secondary protagonist of Dollman vs. Demonic Toys.

The Master, or The Kid - is an extremely powerful and malevolent demon. He is the main antagonist of the first Demonic Toys film.

Brick Bardo  - The main protagonist of the 1991 film Dollman and its crossover sequel Dollman vs Demonic Toys, he teams up with Judith Gray in taking down the Toys.

Nurse Ginger - A character from another Full Moon film Bad Channels.

Sybil Pittman - A meek and mild mannered doll collector, and the main protagonist of the Baby Oopsie show.

Robert Toulon - The main protagonist of Puppet Master vs Demonic Toys, he is the great grandson of Andre Toulon.

Alexandra Toulon - Robert's daughter.

Comic book series

Demonic Toys: Play at Your Own Risk! is a 1993 limited horror comic book series by Eternity Comics, based on the 1992 film of the same name.

A teaser poster for Demonic Toys was made with Grizzly Teddy and Jack Attack on it. The Jack Attack and Grizzly Teddy on the poster resembles the ones that appear in the comics. The comics take place 8 years after the first film; the Toys have drastically changed in appearance, Jack Attack is the most significant, and he has arms. The Toy Soldier is also aligned with the Toys.

Issues
 Play at Your Own Risk #1 (January 1993): Eight years after Officer Judith Grey survived the toy massacre at the Toyland Warehouse, the demon child known as "The Kid" attempts another birth through a human infant.
 Play at Your Own Risk #2 (February 1993): "Toyland" is changed to "Arcadia Toy Company", and now run by Jack Norton and assistant Mr. Horse. The factory is torn down and replaced with a high-tech skyscraper. But evil still exists beneath them. Mr. Horse hires some thugs while Jack unveils the new skyscraper.
 Play at Your Own Risk #3 (April 1993): While out, Jack discovers Baby Oopsie Daisy, who kills him. His body is taken over by The Kid, who tries to dictate a policy for the largest toy producing company in the world. But Grey's son, Matthew, now 8 years old, has suspicions about Jack.
 Play at Your Own Risk #4 (August 1993): Arcadia employee Dapne meets Jack, who, when he discovers her pregnancy, decides to keep her for it.

Dollman Kills the Full Moon Universe
Dollman Kills the Full Moon Universe is a comic series based on the Dollman film series released from August 2018 to January 2019. The first issue is a callback to Dollman vs Demonic Toys, making it the second time the character has gone against the demonic toys.

Reception 
The first film in the series, Demonic Toys, received a predominantly negative reception upon release. A reviewer for TV Guide criticized it as "a rehash of the company's PUPPETMASTER series".

The second film, Dollman vs. Demonic Toys, was panned by Dennis Fischer in his book covering science fiction directors as "one of Band's worst missteps". A reviewer for Billboard was more favorable, writing that "Good-humored viewers will enjoy this silly but fast-moving quickie."

Critic Scott Weinberg wrote a negative review for the third film on DVD Talk, writing that it was "not funny, it's not scary, and it's certainly not a worthwhile way to spend 90 minutes of the time you're given on this planet." Director Ted Nicolaou was critical of Puppet Master vs. Demonic Toys in a 2017 interview with Video Fugue, as he felt that it was "kind of a big mistake, I think, in a lot of ways".

Dread Central reviewed Demonic Toys 2, stating that "While I find myself neither enjoying nor hating the return of the Demonic Toys, it was the film’s irritating, repetitive score that soured me more than anything else."

Horror Society reviewed Baby Oopsie and rated it a 3/5, stating "the film makes good use of practical effects and beautiful puppets. We get some bloody kills that sometimes happen off screen or was only in frame for a quick second but they did deliver some fun practical effects that you would expect from Full Moon. Overall, Baby Oopsie was a lot of fun and the movie I didn’t know I needed. It was very enjoyable and I look forward to where this story is going to take me next."

Releases 
The Demonic Toys series has been predominantly released direct-to-video with the exception of the 2004 Puppet Master vs. Demonic Toys, which premiered on the SyFy Channel in 2004 before it was released to DVD on January 17, 2006.

See also
 Killer toy

References

Films about sentient toys
English-language films
American supernatural horror films
Demonic Toys films
Puppet films
Films about dolls